Nokona is a genus of moths in the family Sesiidae.

Species
Subgenus Nokona Matsumura, 1931
Nokona aurivena (Bryk, 1947)
Nokona bicincta (Walker, [1865])
Nokona chinensis (Leech, 1889b)
Nokona coreana Toševski & Arita, 1993
Nokona feralis (Leech, 1889)
Nokona iridina (Bryk, 1947)
Nokona nigra  Arita, Kimura & Owada, 2009
Nokona pompilus (Bryk, 1947)
Nokona purpurea (Yano, 1965)
Nokona regalis (Butler, 1878) (Grape worm)
Nokona acaudata  Arita & Gorbunov, 2001
Nokona christineae  Fischer, 2003
Nokona chrysoidea (Zukowsky, 1932)
Nokona davidi (Le Cerf, 1917)
Nokona formosana  Arita & Gorbunov, 2001
Nokona heterodesma (Diakonoff, [1968])
Nokona inexpectata  Arita & Gorbunov, 2001
Nokona palawana  Kallies & Arita, 1998
Nokona pilamicola (Strand, [1916])
Nokona powondrae (Dalla Torre, 1925)
Nokona semidiaphana (Zukowsky, 1929)
Nokona sikkima (Moore, 1879)
Nokona stroehlei  Fischer, 2002
Nokona carulifera (Hampson, 1919)
Nokona coracodes (Turner, 1922)
Subgenus Aritasesia Nakamura, 2009
Nokona pernix (Leech, 1889)
Nokona rubra  Arita & Toševski, 1992

References

Sesiidae
Taxa named by Shōnen Matsumura